Rannoch Moor is an expanse of around  of boggy moorland to the west of Loch Rannoch in Scotland, where it extends from and into westerly Perth and Kinross, northerly Lochaber (in Highland), and the area of Highland Scotland toward its south-west, northern Argyll and Bute.  Rannoch Moor is designated a Site of Special Scientific Interest (SSSI) and a Special Area of Conservation. Much of the western part of the moor lies within the Ben Nevis and Glen Coe National Scenic Area, one of 40 such areas in Scotland.

It is notable for its wildlife, and is particularly famous as being the sole British location for the Rannoch-rush, named after the moor. It was frequently visited by Horace Donisthorpe who collected many unusual species of ants on the moor and surrounding hilly ground. Today it is still one of the few remaining habitats for Formica exsecta, the "narrow-headed ant", although recent surveys have failed to produce any sign of Formica pratensis, which Donisthorpe recorded in the area in the early part of the 20th century.

Peat deposits pose major difficulties to builders of roads and railways. When the West Highland Line was built across Rannoch Moor, its builders had to float the tracks on a mattress of tree roots, brushwood and thousands of tons of earth and ashes. The A82 road crosses western Rannoch Moor on its way to Glen Coe and Fort William.

The desolate and isolated Gorton was a private railway station built near Meall a Ghortain that once housed a school for local railway workers' children, and still serves as the Gorton Crossing engineers' siding.

Geography 
This expanse was at the heart of the last significant icefield in the UK during the Loch Lomond Stadial at the end of the last ice age. Once the great mass of ice had melted, the subsequent unburdening of the Earth's crust resulted in a continuing rise in the land which is estimated to be of the order of 2–3 mm per year.

In fiction 
Kidnapped by Robert Louis Stevenson.

According to Don Rosa, Castle McDuck, the ancestral home of Scrooge McDuck's family, the Clan McDuck is located in Dismal Downs somewhere on Rannoch Moor.

In the Highlander novel, The Element of Fire, Duncan and Connor MacLeod track the antagonist Khordas to Rannoch Moor. There Duncan defeats Khordas' female companion, Nerissa. 

In the 1999 young adult fantasy novel Fire Bringer by David Clement-Davies, the story's protagonist is named Rannoch. This may have been inspired by the name of the Moor, particularly in light of the book's setting of 13th-century Scotland.

Filming location
The moor was used as a filming location for the television series Outlander, and also for a short scene in the film Harry Potter and the Deathly Hallows – Part 1.
Corrour railway station was used for the remote rural location scene in 1996's Trainspotting.

See also
List of places in Perth and Kinross
List of places in Argyll and Bute
List of places in Highland
The Heart Stone
The Soldiers' Trenches, Moor of Rannoch

References

External links

Lochaber
Ramsar sites in Scotland
Sites of Special Scientific Interest in Lorne
Sites of Special Scientific Interest in South Lochaber
Sites of Special Scientific Interest in West Perth
Special Areas of Conservation in Scotland
Protected areas of Perth and Kinross
Moorlands of Scotland
BRannoch